Putla District is located in the west of the Sierra Sur Region of the State of Oaxaca, Mexico.

Municipalities

The district includes the following municipalities:
 
Constancia del Rosario
La Reforma, Oaxaca
Mesones Hidalgo
Putla Villa de Guerrero
San Andrés Cabecera Nueva
San Pedro Amuzgos
Santa Cruz Itundujia
Santa Lucía Monteverde
Santa María Ipalapa
Santa María Zacatepec
Santa Cruz Rio Venado

References

Districts of Oaxaca
Sierra Sur de Oaxaca